Lirularia antoniae is a species of sea snail, a marine gastropod mollusk in the family Trochidae, the top snails.

Distribution
This marine species occurs in the Atlantic Ocean off São Tomé and Príncipe.

References

External links
 To Biodiversity Heritage Library (1 publication)
 To Encyclopedia of Life
 To World Register of Marine Species
 

antoniae
Molluscs of the Atlantic Ocean
Invertebrates of São Tomé and Príncipe
Gastropods described in 1997